Earth Museum or Museum of the Earth may refer to:

Museum of the Earth, a natural history museum in Ithaca, New York.
Museum of the Earth, Polish Academy of Sciences, a natural history museum in Warsaw, Poland.
Earth Sciences Museum, a geology museum in Rio de Janeiro, Brazil
Sedgwick Museum of Earth Sciences, a geology museum at the University of Cambridge
The Earth Museum, a Turkish science fiction anthology.
Museum of Earth History, a creationist museum in Dallas Texas